Chrisville is a suburb of Johannesburg, South Africa. It is located in Region F of the City of Johannesburg Metropolitan Municipality. A large part of the suburb is currently taken up by a mine dump.

History
The suburb is situated on part of an old Witwatersrand farm called Turffontein. It was established in 1948 and was named after the Chris mine shaft, a Robinson Deep Mine, which was named after a chairman Douglas Christopherson.

References

Johannesburg Region F